Route 326 is a collector road in the Canadian province of Nova Scotia. It is located in Colchester County and connects Brule at Trunk 6 with Earltown at Route 311.

Communities
Earltown
MacBains Corner
East Earltown
Denmark
Middleton Corner
Keble
Brule Corner

See also
List of Nova Scotia provincial highways

References

External links
Map of Nova Scotia

Nova Scotia provincial highways
Roads in Colchester County